The IP Casino Resort Spa is a resort located in Biloxi, Mississippi. It was founded by Minnesota businessman Ralph Engelstad.

History 
The property officially opened for business on December 22, 1997 as the Imperial Palace Hotel and Casino Biloxi, the sister of the Imperial Palace in Paradise, Nevada. When Engelstad died in 2002, the casino ownership transferred to the Ralph Engelstad and Betty Engelstad Trust.  The casino operated as its own limited partnership, Imperial Palace LLC, under the Trust's oversight. At the time of Engelstad's death, the resort was the second-largest privately owned hotel in the world, with nearly 1,000 rooms and 900 employees. On August 22, 2005 the Ralph Engelstad and Betty Engelstad Trust announced it was selling the Imperial Palace Las Vegas to Harrah's Imperial Palace Corporation, a subsidiary of Harrah's Entertainment. The sale was completed on December 23, 2005.

The devastation created by Hurricane Katrina on August 29, 2005, caused the Imperial Palace Biloxi to temporarily close its doors to the public so that necessary repairs could be made.  During this recovery period, the hotel was able to house and accommodate numerous disaster relief organizations such as the Federal Emergency Management Agency (FEMA) and the Mississippi Emergency Management Agency (MEMA).

The Group, who specialize in hospitality, casino, and entertainment projects, were called upon to remodel and revamp the entire property. Roy Anderson Corp completed most of the repairs and enhancement of the property.

The IP was the first casino on the Mississippi Gulf Coast to reopen after Hurricane Katrina hit on December 22, 2005. Prior to its official reopening, it was announced that the name of the property would be changed from the Imperial Palace to the IP Hotel and Casino to prevent any confusion with its former sister property.  The property has since undergone another slight name change, to become the IP Casino Resort & Spa, and has also begun using a new logo designed by Dan King of King Design Arts (formerly Studio Arts & Letters).

The property has added a new digital billboard that stands next to the north-bound lanes of Interstate 110. The IP opened its land-based gaming expansion on the second floor of the property on May 16, 2008.  This expansion includes the Asian-themed restaurant named Tien.  The resort opened its new arcade on the 2nd floor of the hotel on November 20, 2008, and in December 2008 became the exclusive casino on the Gulf Coast to offer Rapid Roulette (electronic, touch-screen terminals).  IP's showroom, named Studio A, opened December 31, 2008 with Morris Day performing, while the official "grand opening" of Studio A was on January 10, 2009, with Toby Keith headlining.

The hotel received the AAA American Automobile Association Four-Diamond Award for 2008 and 2009, with its fine-dining restaurant thirty-two being the only restaurant in Biloxi to receive this award two years in a row.

Boyd Gaming bought the IP in October 2011 for $278 million cash, plus a $10 million donation to the Engelstad Family Foundation.

Description 

Because the base of the IP Hotel is elevated some ten feet above the base of the Beau Rivage, it appears to be the taller of the two, although it is actually twelve feet shorter. Additionally, the IP Hotel features windows on every floor, while the Beau Rivage Hotel features windows that span two floors, which makes the height difference even more deceiving.

References

External links 
IP Casino Resort & Spa

Buildings and structures in Biloxi, Mississippi
Casinos in Mississippi
Resorts in Mississippi
Hotels in Mississippi
Towers in Mississippi
Tourist attractions in Harrison County, Mississippi
Boyd Gaming
Casino hotels
1997 establishments in Mississippi